Romain Habran (born 14 June 1994) is a French footballer who plays as a winger for Hapoel Afula. Besides France, he has played in Belgium, Israel, and Spain.

Club career
Habran joined FC Sochaux-Montbéliard in 2014, on loan from Paris Saint-Germain. He made his Ligue 2 debut at the opening day of the 2014–15 season against US Orléans.

A year later, he was once again loaned in Ligue 2, joining Stade Lavallois. He went on to make 26 league appearances for the club.

In August 2018, after one year with Royal Antwerp, he signed a three years contract with Ashdod.

On 27 January 2022 signed for Hapoel Afula.

Career statistics

References

External links
 
 
 
 
 

1994 births
Living people
People from Villeneuve-la-Garenne
Footballers from Hauts-de-Seine
Association football midfielders
French footballers
FC Sochaux-Montbéliard players
Stade Lavallois players
US Boulogne players
Royal Antwerp F.C. players
F.C. Ashdod players
Gimnàstic de Tarragona footballers
UD Melilla footballers
FK Sūduva Marijampolė players
Hapoel Afula F.C. players
Ligue 2 players
Championnat National players
Segunda División B players
Israeli Premier League players
A Lyga players
Liga Leumit players
French expatriate footballers
Expatriate footballers in Belgium
Expatriate footballers in Israel
Expatriate footballers in Spain
Expatriate footballers in Lithuania
French expatriate sportspeople in Belgium
French expatriate sportspeople in Israel
French expatriate sportspeople in Spain
French expatriate sportspeople in Lithuania
French people of Martiniquais descent
France youth international footballers
Black French sportspeople